The Lone Star Ranger was a 1915 novel by Zane Grey:

The Lone Star Ranger may also refer to several films based on the novel:

 The Lone Star Ranger (1919 film), American silent film western directed by J. Gordon Edwards and starring William Farnum
 The Lone Star Ranger (1923 film), American silent film western directed by Lambert Hillyer and starring Tom Mix
 The Lone Star Ranger (1930 film), American western film directed by A.F. Erickson and starring George O'Brien
 Lone Star Ranger, a 1942 American western film directed by James Tinling and starring John Kimbrough

Other uses
 Lone Star Ranger, a series of young adult western novels by James J. Griffin
 Lone Star Ranger, a stage name of singer John White  (1902–1992)

See also
 Lone Texas Ranger, a 1945 American Western film
 Lone Ranger, an iconic fictional character
 Last of the Duanes (disambiguation), original version of the story by Zane Gray and the title of several films, often featuring the same directors and cast members